Napoleon Dynamite is a 2004 American comedy film produced by Jeremy Coon, Chris Wyatt and Sean Covel, written by Jared and Jerusha Hess and directed by Jared Hess. The film stars Jon Heder in the role of the titular character, a nerdy high-school student who deals with several dilemmas: befriending an immigrant who wants to be class president, awkwardly pursuing a romance with a fellow student, and living with his quirky family.

The film was Hess's first full-length movie and is partially adapted from his earlier short film, Peluca (2002). Napoleon Dynamite was acquired at the Sundance Film Festival by Fox Searchlight Pictures, who partnered up with MTV Films and Paramount Pictures for the release. Filming was done at Preston High School, and in different areas in Franklin County, Idaho, in the summer of 2003. It debuted at the Sundance Film Festival in January 2004. Most of the situations in the movie are loosely based on the life of Jared Hess. The film's total worldwide gross revenue was $46,122,713. The film has since developed a cult following and was voted at number 14 on Bravo's 100 funniest movies.

Plot
Napoleon Dynamite is a socially awkward 16-year-old from Preston, Idaho, who lives with his grandmother, Carlinda Dynamite, and his older brother, Kipland Ronald "Kip" Dynamite. Napoleon daydreams his way through school, reluctantly dealing with various bullies who torment him.

Napoleon's grandmother is injured in a quad-bike accident and asks their Uncle Rico to look after the boys while she recovers. Rico, a middle-aged and flirtatious former high-school athlete who lives in a conversion van, treats Napoleon like a child. He takes advantage of the visit to team up with Kip in a get-rich-quick scheme by selling items door-to-door. Kip wants money to pay for his internet girlfriend, LaFawnduh, to travel from Detroit to see him while Rico believes riches will help him get over his failed dreams of NFL stardom and the recent breakup with his girlfriend.

Napoleon becomes friends with two students at his school: Deb, a shy girl who runs various small businesses to raise money for college, and Pedro, a bold yet calm transfer student from Juarez, Mexico. Preparations begin for the high school dance. Pedro asks Summer Wheatley, a popular and snobby girl, to be his dance partner, but is rebuffed. He then asks Deb, who gladly accepts. Pedro encourages an upset Napoleon to find a date for himself, and he picks a popular classmate, Trisha, from the school yearbook. As a gift, he draws an unintentionally bad picture of her and delivers it to Trisha's mother, who is one of Rico's customers. Rico tells embarrassing stories about Napoleon to evoke sympathy from Trisha's mother, who buys his wares and forces Trisha to reluctantly accept Napoleon's invitation. Trisha goes to the dance with Napoleon but soon abandons him, causing Pedro to let Deb dance with Napoleon.

Pedro decides to run for class president, pitting him against Summer. The two factions put up flyers and hand out trinkets to students to attract voters. To increase their respect by demonstrating "skills," Napoleon and Pedro enter a Future Farmers of America competition, grading milk and cow udders. They do well and win medals, but this does little for their popularity. Incidentally, Napoleon visits a thrift store and buys an instructional dance videotape called D-Qwon's Dance Grooves.

Kip's girlfriend, LaFawnduh, arrives from Detroit and gives him an urban makeover, outfitting him in hip-hop regalia. Seeing that he is learning to dance, LaFawnduh gives Napoleon a mixtape.

Rico's ongoing sales scheme causes friction with Napoleon as he continues to spread embarrassing rumors about Napoleon to prospective customers. Rico tries to sell Deb a breast-enhancement product, claiming it was Napoleon's suggestion, which causes her to break off their friendship. His scheme ends after his sales pitch to the wife of the town's martial arts instructor, Rex, goes awry: Rex assaults Rico after unexpectedly arriving during his demonstration of the breast-enhancement product.

Summer gives a speech before the student body on election day, and then presents a dance skit to "Larger than Life" by the Backstreet Boys with a school club. A despondent Pedro gives an unimpressive speech after discovering he is also required to perform a skit. To save Pedro's campaign, Napoleon gives the sound engineer LaFawnduh's mixtape and spontaneously performs an elaborate dance routine to "Canned Heat" by Jamiroquai. Proving himself to be a skilled dancer, Napoleon's routine receives a standing ovation from students, stunning Summer and her boyfriend, Don.

Pedro becomes the class president, Kip and LaFawnduh leave on a bus for Michigan, Rico reunites with his estranged girlfriend, Grandma returns from the hospital, and Napoleon and Deb reconcile and play tetherball.

In a post-credits scene set two months later, Kip and Lafawnduh get married, and Napoleon appears with a horse which the bride and groom ride out on.

Cast

 Jon Heder as Napoleon Dynamite
 Efren Ramirez as Pedro Sánchez
 Tina Majorino as Deborah "Deb" Bradshaw
 Aaron Ruell as Kipland Ronald "Kip" Dynamite
 Jon Gries as Rico Dynamite
 Haylie Duff as Summer Wheatley
 Emily Kennard as Trisha Stevens
 Shondrella Avery as LaFawnduh Lucas
 Sandy Martin as Grandma Carlinda Dynamite
 Diedrich Bader as Rex
 Carmen Brady as Starla
 Trevor Snarr as Don
 Ellen Dubin as Aunt Ilene

Production

Origin

In 2002, Brigham Young University film students Jon Heder and Jared Hess collaborated on a class project; the result was a 9-minute short movie shot on black-and-white 16mm film entitled Peluca about a nerdy high school student named Seth.

Peluca was shown at the 2003 Slamdance Film Festival and was well received. Jeremy Coon convinced Hess to drop out of school and adapt it into a feature-length film, and he helped him to find investors for the project. Hess sent the short film and the script to a variety of different casting directors, many of whom thought that the idea was "too weird or they just didn't like the character," Hess explained. One casting director suggested Jake Gyllenhaal over unknown actor Jon Heder for the lead role but Hess believed Heder was the only actor to play the part. Jason Lee was offered the role of Uncle Rico while Brad Garrett auditioned for Rex and enjoyed the script, but decided not to commit. Heder was paid $1,000 for starring in the film, but successfully negotiated to receive more after the film became a runaway success.

Filming and setting 
Hess shot the film on location in Preston, in southeastern Idaho, located near the Utah border, in July 2003. Operating on a tight budget of $400,000, Hess cast many of his friends from school, including Heder and Aaron Ruell, and he relied on the generosity of Preston locals, who provided housing and food to crew members. Among the established actors in the cast was comedy veteran Diedrich Bader, who filmed his scenes as virile martial art instructor Rex in one day. He recalled in 2011 that Napoleon Dynamite "still to this day [is] one of the two top scripts I've ever read", alongside Office Space (1999), one of his most-recognized roles. "It was very, very hot," Hess recalled in a Rolling Stone interview. "But it was so much fun being in this rural farm town making a movie. We shot it in 23 days, so we were moving very, very fast; I just didn't have a lot of film to be able to do a lot of takes. It was a bunch of friends getting together to make a movie. It was like, 'Are people going to get this? Is it working?'"

Hess describes the film as being "so autobiographical". "I grew up in a family of six boys in Preston, Idaho, and the character of Napoleon was a hybrid of all the most nerdy and awkward parts of me and my brothers growing up. Jerusha really was like Deb growing up. Her mom made her a dress when she was going to a middle school dance and she said, 'I hadn't really developed yet, so my mom overcompensated and made some very large, fluffy shoulders.' Some guy dancing with her patted the sleeves and actually said, 'I like your sleeves ... they're real big,"' Hess said in an interview with Rolling Stone.

The film is set during the 2004–2005 school year, as shown on Napoleon's student ID card in the title sequence. The film contains several culturally retroactive elements harkening back to the 1980s or 1990s. For example, Deb wears a side ponytail and Napoleon wears Moon Boots, both popular fashion trends of the 1980s. One scene is set at a school dance that plays only 1980s music such as Alphaville's "Forever Young," whereas an earlier scene features students performing a sign language rendition of "The Rose" (1980) sung by Bette Midler. Much of the technology in the film is also archaic; Napoleon uses a VCR and Walkman cassette player, Kip connects to the Internet via a pay-per-minute dial-up connection and Uncle Rico drives a 1975 Dodge Tradesman. The song Napoleon Dynamite dances to at the end of the film—"Canned Heat" by Jamiroquai—came out in 1999.

Opening sequence
The film was originally made without opening titles. Audiences at test screenings were confused about when the film was set. Eight months after the film was completed, the title sequence was filmed in cinematographer Munn Powell's basement. Ruell, who played Kip, suggested the idea of the title sequence. The sequence shows a pair of hands placing and removing several objects on a table. Objects like plates of food had the credits written in condiments, while other objects like a Lemonheads box or a tube of ChapStick had the credits printed on them. Hess explains:

On the studio's reaction to the sequence, Hess adds:

Dance scene
The Hesses wrote the climactic dance scene because they knew Heder liked to dance. "Jared's wife was like, 'Jon, I hear you're pretty good dancer. I've seen you boogie; it's pretty sweet,'" recalled Heder. "And I was like, 'Well, I like to dabble.' I liked to mess around sometimes in front of friends and dance. But I did take pride in it. I won't be modest. I wasn't great but I did like to mess around ... Cut to two years later: after we had shot the short, they were like, 'Okay we're going to have you dancing in the movie as the climax. This is going to make or break the film.'"

When it came to shooting the dance scene for the final film, the producers scheduled to film it towards the end of the film. When they finally got to the scene, they were running out of money and film. They only had one roll of film (approximately 10.5 minutes) left to shoot.

"It was a lot of pressure," Heder observed. "I was like, 'Oh, crap!' This isn't just a silly little scene. This is the moment where everything comes, and he's making the sacrifice for his friend. That's the whole theme of the movie. Everything leads up to this. Napoleon's been this loser. This has to be the moment where he lands a victory. He gets up there, and it's quiet: no reaction from the audience."

The dance was spontaneously improvised by Heder, with some choreography help from Tina Majorino, and additional moves taken from Saturday Night Fever, Michael Jackson, and Soul Train. "They were like, 'No, Jon, just figure it out.' So I just winged it. I danced three times and they took the best pieces from each of those."

"When you're shooting in independent film, you don't know what you're going to get the rights to," Heder explained. "We thought Jamiroquai might be expensive. So we danced to three different songs. To that song and another Jamiroquai song, "Little L." We danced to Michael Jackson, something off of Off the Wall. Just those three. And then we got the rights to Jamiroquai. And I think that was half our budget."

Origin of the name "Napoleon Dynamite"
Upon the film's release, it was noted that the name "Napoleon Dynamite" had originally been used by musician Elvis Costello, most visibly on his 1986 album Blood & Chocolate, although he had used the pseudonym on a single B-side as early as 1982. Filmmaker Jared Hess states that he was not aware of Costello's use of the name until two days before the end of shooting, when he was informed by a teenage extra. He later said, "Had I known that name was used by anybody else prior to shooting the whole film, it definitely would have been changed ... I listen to hip-hop, dude. It's a pretty embarrassing coincidence." Hess claims that "Napoleon Dynamite" was the name of a man he met around 2000 on the streets of Cicero, Illinois, while doing missionary work for the Church of Jesus Christ of Latter-day Saints.

Costello believes that Hess got the name from him, whether directly or indirectly. Costello said, "The guy just denies completely that I made the name up ... but I invented it. Maybe somebody told him the name and he truly feels that he came to it by chance. But it's two words that you're never going to hear together."

Lawsuit against Fox Searchlight Pictures
On August 30, 2011, Napoleon Pictures filed a lawsuit against Fox Searchlight for $10 million for underreporting royalties and taking improper revenue deductions. In its term sheet, Fox agreed to pay 31.66% of net profits on home video. The lawsuit said that a 2008 audit revealed that Fox was only paying net royalties on home videos at a 9.66% rate, and there were underreported royalties and improper deductions.

Napoleon Pictures also alleged that Fox had breached the agreement in multiple other respects, including underreporting pay television license fees, failing to report electronic sell-through revenue, charging residuals on home video sales, as well as overcharging residuals on home video sales, deducting a number of costs and charges Fox had no right to deduct and/or for which there is no supporting documentation.

In May 2012, Fox went to trial after failing to win a summary judgment on the case. The trial began on June 19, 2012. On November 28, 2012, a 74-page decision sided with Fox on 9 of the 11 issues. Napoleon Pictures was awarded $150,000 based on Fox accounting irregularities.

Release
Napoleon Dynamite premiered at the Sundance Film Festival on January 17, 2004, and was theatrically released on June 11, 2004, in the United States by Fox Searchlight Pictures, Paramount Pictures and MTV Films.

On June 9, 2014, the film was screened at Academy of Motion Picture Arts and Sciences in Los Angeles to celebrate its 10th anniversary. In addition, a bronze statue of Napoleon Dynamite, complete with tetherball, was placed at the 20th Century Fox studio lot.

Home media
Napoleon Dynamite was released on VHS and DVD on December 21, 2004, by 20th Century Fox Home Entertainment in North America and by Paramount Home Entertainment in all other territories.

The "10th Anniversary Edition" Blu-ray was released on June 2, 2014.

Reception

Box office
Despite a very limited initial release, Napoleon Dynamite was a commercial success. It was filmed on an estimated budget of a mere $400,000, and less than a year after its release, it had grossed $44,940,956. 
It also spawned a slew of merchandise, from refrigerator magnets to T-shirts and Halloween costumes.

Critical response
On the review aggregator website Rotten Tomatoes, 72% of 175 critics' reviews are positive, with an average rating of 6.40/10. The website's consensus reads, "A charming, quirky, and often funny comedy." Metacritic, which uses a weighted average, assigned the film a score of 64 out of 100, based on 36 critics, indicating "generally favorable reviews".

Peter Travers of Rolling Stone magazine complimented the film, saying, "Hess and his terrific cast – Heder is geek perfection – make their own kind of deadpan hilarity. You'll laugh till it hurts. Sweet." The Christian Science Monitor called the film "a refreshing new take on the overused teen-comedy genre" and said that the film "may not make you laugh out loud – it's too sly and subtle for that – but it will have you smiling every minute, and often grinning widely at its weirded-out charm."

Michael Atkinson of The Village Voice praised the film as "an epic, magisterially observed pastiche on all-American geekhood, flooring the competition with a petulant shove." In a mixed review, The New York Times praised Heder's performance and the "film's most interesting quality, which is its stubborn, confident, altogether weird individuality", while criticizing the film's resolution that comes "too easily." Roger Ebert of the Chicago Sun-Times gave the film one-and-a-half stars, writing that he felt that "the movie makes no attempt to make [Napoleon] likable" and that it contained "a kind of studied stupidity that sometimes passes as humor". At the time, Entertainment Weekly critics gave it a grade C and C− respectively. Entertainment Weekly later ranked Napoleon #88 on its 2010 list of The 100 Greatest Characters of the Last 20 Years, saying, "A high school misfit found a sweet spot, tapping into our inner dork." The film was on several year-end lists. Rolling Stone placed it at number 22 of the 25 Top DVDs of 2004.

Awards
 Best Feature Film at the U.S. Comedy Arts Festival the same year. The film's budget was only $400,000. When the film rights were sold to a major distributor, Fox Searchlight Pictures, Fox supplied additional funds for the post-credits scene.
 In 2005, the film – itself an MTV Films production – won three MTV Movie Awards, for Breakthrough Male Performance, Best Musical Performance, and Best Movie. The film is #14 on Bravo's "100 Funniest Movies".
 It won the 2005 Golden Trailer Awards for Best Comedy.
 It won the 2005 Golden Satellite Award for Best Original Score (John Swihart).
 Four awards at the Teen Choice Awards. Choice Movie: Female Breakout Star for Haylie Duff, Choice Movie: Dance Scene, Choice Movie: Hissy Fit for Jon Heder, and Choice Movie: Comedy.
 The 2004 Film Discovery Jury Award for Best Feature
 April 2005, the Idaho Legislature approved a resolution commending the filmmakers for producing Napoleon Dynamite, specifically enumerating the benefits the movie has brought to Idaho, as well as for showcasing various aspects of Idaho's culture and economy.

Soundtrack

Future

Possible sequel
After nearly two decades of rumors, it was reported in September 2020, that a sequel to Napoleon Dynamite was in discussion. Heder stated that he is interested in a darker take on the film's characters instead of rehashing the original film's plot:

Ramirez improvised a script for a sequel in which Pedro is married to Summer Wheatley, has five kids and owns a bakery. In the same hypothetical script, Kip has fulfilled his dream to become a cage fighter, while Rico has ventured into a new business that he believes will make him rich.

In January 2023, Heder stated that he believed a sequel was "inevitable" and reiterated his interest in displaying a darker tone for the sequel.

Animated series

In April 2010, Fox announced that an animated series was in development, with the original cast reprising their roles.  The series debuted on Sunday, January 15, 2012. Director Jared Hess, his co-screenwriter wife Jerusha, and Mike Scully produced the show in association with 20th Century Fox Television. On May 14, 2012, it was announced that Fox had canceled the series after 6 episodes. The complete series was released on DVD on November 4, 2014, by Olive Films.

Legacy

The term "The Napoleon Dynamite Problem" has been used to describe the phenomenon where "quirky" films such as Napoleon Dynamite, Lost in Translation and I Heart Huckabees prove difficult for researchers to create algorithms that are able to predict whether or not a particular viewer will like the film based on their ratings of previously viewed films.

For several years the city of Preston held a "Napoleon Dynamite Festival" in the summer. Many of the featured festival themes related to events occurring during the film. For example: Tetherball Tournament, Tater Tot Eating Contest, Moon Boot Dance, Impersonation, Look-A-Like Contest, Football Throwing Contest and more. Fifteen years after the film came out fans continue to visit Preston, primarily as a side trip as they make their way to Yellowstone National Park.

The success of Napoleon Dynamite led to other films set in small towns, such as Little Miss Sunshine and Juno, which would have similar critical, popular, and financial success.

See also
 Napoleon Dynamite Festival
 Napoleon Dynamite: The Game

References

External links

 
 
 
 

 
2000s buddy comedy films
2000s coming-of-age comedy films
2000s English-language films
2000s teen comedy films
2004 comedy films
2004 directorial debut films
2004 films
2004 independent films
American buddy comedy films
American coming-of-age comedy films
American high school films
American independent films
American teen comedy films
Features based on short films
Films about bullying
Films about elections
Films adapted into television shows
Films directed by Jared Hess
Films scored by John Swihart
Films set in 2004
Films set in Idaho
Films shot in Idaho
Fox Searchlight Pictures films
Idaho culture
MTV Films films
Paramount Pictures films
20th Century Studios franchises
2000s American films